Blatchington Mill School is a coeducational secondary school in Hove, Brighton and Hove for 11 to 16-year-olds.

Admissions
It is a school of non-denominational religion. The total number of pupils in 2019, of all ages, was 1,553. It is in West Blatchington with access to the A27 via the A2038, and on the A2023.

History
The school takes its name from the West Blatchington Windmill which is situated just East of the school gates.

Grammar school
Hove County Grammar School for Boys was on Holmes Avenue.

Comprehensive
Blatchington Mill School - originally Blatchington Mill school and Sixth-form College was formed in 1979 from the amalgamation of Hove Grammar School for Boys, Knoll Boys School, and Nevill County Secondary School.

Academic performance

At secondary level in 2018, GCSE performance showed an average Progress 8 score, an above average Attainment 8 score and an above average proportion of children achieving Grade 5 or above in English & maths GCSEs.

At A level in 2018, the average result was D+ compared to B− in Brighton and Hove and C+ nationally.

Blatchington Mill School and Sixth Form College was last inspected by Ofsted during February 2017. The school was assessed as Good.

Pearson Computing Competition
In 2012, three students from Blatchington Mill won a nationwide competition to create a mobile application to help children and teenagers learn.

Notable former pupils

Hove Grammar School for Boys
 Jim Parks, Sussex and England cricketer
 Barry V. L. Potter, Professor of Medicinal & Biological Chemistry
 Peter Wales, Sussex cricketer

Blatchington Mill School
 Bobby Barry (1992–97) musician
Gareth Barry (1992–97) professional footballer with Manchester City F.C.
 Mia Clarke (1994–99) musician; former guitarist with Electrelane
 Katie Price  glamour model, author and television personality
 Dakota Blue Richards, actor
 Ollie Richards (2003–08) England rugby player 
 Michael Standing (1993–97) professional footballer with Bradford City F.C.
 Jordan Stephens (2003–08) musician; Rizzle Kicks
 Grace Carter (singer) (2008–13) - musician.
Steve Baddeley, badminton player
 Peter Brackley, Channel 4 football commentator in the 1990s
 Lionel March, mathematician and architect
 Jack Pizzey (television), television documentary maker
 David Standing, Sussex cricketer
 Gary Willard, football referee

References

External links
 Former school William H. Brock, Looking Back. Hove Grammar School for Boys 1936-1979 (London, 2018).

1979 establishments in England
Secondary schools in Brighton and Hove
Educational institutions established in 1979
Community schools in Brighton and Hove